Mossman Inlet is a narrow ice-filled inlet which recedes north  between Cape Kidson and the southwest end of Kemp Peninsula, along the east coast of Palmer Land, Antarctica. This inlet was first seen and photographed from the air in December 1940 by the United States Antarctic Service, and during 1947 it was photographed from the air by the Ronne Antarctic Research Expedition under Finn Ronne, who in conjunction with the Falkland Islands Dependencies Survey (FIDS) charted it from the ground. It was named by the FIDS for British meteorologist and climatologist Robert C. Mossman, 1870–1940, a member of the Scottish National Antarctic Expedition under William Speirs Bruce, 1902–04.

References

Inlets of Palmer Land